Stephanie Lecor, known professionally as Steph Lecor is a Haitian-American cast member of Love & Hip Hop: Miami and singer.

Early years
Lecor was born and raised in Miami, Florida to Haitian parents. Her father was in a Haitian band, where she would watch him record at an early age. Her parents put her in choir practice and was given vocal lessons as a child.

Career

2009–present: Kulture Shock
In 2009, after touring nationwide as a backup singer for Ky-Mani Marley, Lecor started a solo career. Then, she discovered Jase and City Boi, who had collaborated on songwriting with various artists for Interscope Records and Atlantic Records, were looking for a female singer to create a group called Kulture Shock. Together, the group was signed by Poe Boy Entertainment in a joint venture deal with France-based record label Artop/Universal.

Solo singles

References

Living people
American people of Haitian descent
American women pop singers
American women hip hop musicians
American hip hop singers
Musicians from Miami
Year of birth missing (living people)
21st-century American women singers
21st-century American singers